The Helping Hand is a 1908 American silent short drama film directed by D. W. Griffith.

Cast
 Flora Finch as Mrs. Harcourt
 Linda Arvidson as Daisy Harcourt
 George Gebhardt as The Man with the Letter / Wedding Guest
 Anita Hendrie as Jessie Marshall
 Charles Inslee
 Florence Lawrence as Wedding Guest
 Mack Sennett as Wedding Guest
 Charles Avery as Man at Brothel
 Robert Harron as Messenger
 Arthur V. Johnson as Mr. Miller
 Marion Leonard as Wedding Guest
 Tom Moore as Man in Office / Wedding Guest
 Harry Solter as Bill Wolfe

References

External links
 

1908 films
1908 drama films
Silent American drama films
American silent short films
American black-and-white films
Films directed by D. W. Griffith
1908 short films
1900s American films